Vendayampatti is a village in the Thanjavur taluk of Thanjavur district, Tamil Nadu, India.

Demographics 

As per the 2001 census, Vendayampatti had a total population of 1294 with 671 males and 623 females. The sex ratio was 928. The literacy rate was 58.78.

References 

 

Villages in Thanjavur district